Lachlan Sim (born 24 November 1969) is a former Australian rules footballer who played with the Brisbane Bears in the Victorian/Australian Football League (VFL/AFL).

Originally from Gippsland Football League club Moe, Sim came to Brisbane from the 1988 VFL draft and played six games in his first season with the Bears. Sim made eight more appearances in 1990 and seven in 1991. He was a member of the Brisbane side which won the 1991 reserves grand final.

After leaving Queensland Sim returned to Gippsland where he would both play and coach. An electrician by profession, he coached the Gippsland Power in the 2003 and 2004 TAC Cup seasons.

References

1969 births
Australian rules footballers from Victoria (Australia)
Brisbane Bears players
Moe Football Club players
Living people